Ana Burgos Acuña (born December 26, 1967) is a triathlete from Spain. She was born in Madrid.

Burgos participated in the second Olympic triathlon at the 2004 Summer Olympics. She took seventh place with a total time of 2:06:02.36. She won the silver medal at the 2006 ITU Duathlon European Championship.

References
 Profile

1967 births
Living people
Spanish female triathletes
Triathletes at the 2004 Summer Olympics
Triathletes at the 2008 Summer Olympics
Olympic triathletes of Spain
Sportspeople from Madrid
Duathletes
Athletes from the Community of Madrid
21st-century Spanish women